Tlumak is a Ukrainian surname. Notable people with the surname include:

 Andriy Tlumak (born 1979),  Ukrainian footballer and manager
 Yuriy Tlumak (born 2002), Ukrainian footballer, son of Andriy

Ukrainian-language surnames